Lorneville is a small community in the Canadian province of Nova Scotia, located  in Cumberland County.  The community is not to be confused with Lornevale, also in Nova Scotia.

References
Lorneville on Destination Nova Scotia

Communities in Cumberland County, Nova Scotia